WQLC (102.1 FM) is a country music formatted radio station primarily serving the Lake City, Florida, area, owned by Fred Dockins, through licensee Dockins Broadcast Group, LLC.

External links

QLC
Country radio stations in the United States
1990 establishments in Florida
Radio stations established in 1990